is a Japanese professional sumo wrestler from Morioka. He made his debut in March 2006 and wrestles for Isenoumi stable. His highest rank has been Maegashira 2 and he has won championships at Jūryō and Makushita level.

Early life and sumo experience
He joined this stable after graduating from a local Morioka city junior high school.

Nishikigi has extremely poor vision and always wears glasses when not practicing or competing, even wearing them for post-bout interviews. He has stated he is unable to see any fans in the crowd during tournaments which helps keep him from getting nervous.

Career
He first stepped onto the dohyō in March 2006. He joined sumo the same time as future top division wrestlers Tochinoshin, Sakaizawa, and Shōhōzan. He worked his way slowly up the ranks, earning sandanme division promotion in July 2008 and makushita in January 2010. However, he struggled in the third division and soon fell back to sandanme. Though he was soon back in makushita  he languished at this level. He managed to contend for the makushita''' championship in November 2010, where he lost in a multiple wrestler playoff, and won the championship in this division outright with a 6–1 record in November 2012. However, continuing mediocre performances kept him in the third division for four and a half years. During these struggling years, he took the ring name of Nishikigi. He was the first wrestler in 144 years to take this name. However, starting in September 2014, 4 consecutive 5-2 records propelled him to the salaried ranks of jūryō for the May 2015 tournament. Finding his stride, it took him a year to work his way up through jūryō and after recording ten wins in January 2016 he was promoted to the top division makuuchi for the first time.

In the top division, Nishikigi initially made little impact but nine wins in July followed by eight in September saw him promoted to a career high of maegashira 6. He then began to struggle and after three consecutive losing records he was demoted back to jūryō after the March tournament. Wrestling at jūryō 4 in May he lost his first two matches but in an unusually open division he entered the penultimate day on 8-5 in a seven-way tie for the lead. After beating Homarefuji he clinched the yūshō or championship on the final day with a victory over the veteran Aminishiki. 

He was promoted back to makuuchi for the July 2017 tournament where he secured his majority of wins against losses on the last day with a defeat of Tokushōryū. He remained near the bottom of the makuuchi division for the next year, just barely avoiding demotion to jūryō before a 10–5 result in September 2018, coupled with a collapse in the form of higher-ranked wrestlers, saw him promoted to maegashira 3. Despite fears that he would be badly exposed at the rank and starting with four straight defeats he rallied to end with an 8–7 result and was promoted to a new career high of maegashira 2 for the January 2019 tournament. He won his first three matches in January, defeating ōzeki Gōeidō and Tochinoshin and earning his first kinboshi or yokozuna upset with a win over Kakuryū. He then had a default win over the retiring Kisenosato to stand undefeated on 4–0, but he lost seven in a row after that and finished with a 7–8 record. 

Nishikigi did not manage a winning record in any tournament in 2019, and was demoted to the jūryō division after the November 2019 tournament. He secured 11 wins and 4 losses in the January 2020 tournament, enough for immediate promotion back to the makuuchi division. However, he then embarked on another run of losing records, and fell to near the bottom of the jūryō division by May 2021. 

Three winning records from September 2021 to January 2022 saw him  return to the top division for the March 2022 tournament. Having already achieved a majority of wins in the July 2022 tournament, he was forced to withdraw on Day 13 due to a COVID-19 outbreak at his stable. This was the first time since his debut in 2006 that he had withdrawn from a tournament, but his run of over 1000 consecutive career appearances will be allowed to continue as the Sumo Association do not regard a withdrawal due to COVID protocols through no fault of the wrestler as breaking a streak.

Fighting style
Nishikigi was initially an oshi-sumo specialist who preferred pushing and thrusting at his opponents to fighting on the mawashi or belt, but has developed his yotsu-sumo technique to become a more balanced competitor. His Japan Sumo Association profile shows that 66 percent of his victories over the last six tournaments have been by either yori-kiri (force out) or oshi-dashi'' (push out).

Personal life
Nishikigi was married in September 2018, with the reception being held in February 2020. He has a daughter born in November 2019.

Career record

See also
List of sumo tournament second division champions
Glossary of sumo terms
List of active sumo wrestlers
List of active gold star earners

References

External links

1990 births
Living people
Japanese sumo wrestlers
Sumo people from Iwate Prefecture